Elizabeth Cavendish may refer to:

Elizabeth Cavendish, later Elizabeth Stuart, Countess of Lennox
Bess of Hardwick (1527–1608), Elizabethan courtier, married to Sir William Cavendish
Elizabeth Cavendish, Duchess of Devonshire (1759–1824), wife of the fifth Duke of Devonshire
Elizabeth Cavendish (lawyer), executive director of Appleseed Foundation
Elizabeth Egerton (1626–1663), née Cavendish, writer
Elizabeth Cavendish, Countess of Devonshire (1619–1689)
Lady Elizabeth Cavendish (1926–2018) courtier